During the 2000–01 English football season, Queens Park Rangers F.C. competed in the Football League First Division.

Final league table

Results
Queens Park Rangers' score comes first

Legend

Football League First Division

FA Cup

League Cup

Players

First-team squad
Squad at end of season

Left club during season

Reserve squad

References

Notes

Queens Park Rangers F.C. seasons
Queens Park Rangers